The Battle of Kaskar was fought between the advancing forces of the Rashidun Caliphate and the Sassanian Empire in Asuristan (present-day Iraq). Following the Battle of Namaraq, the defeated Persian noblemen and governor of Kaškar, Narsi, fled back to his estates in an attempt to save his life. The Muslims soon advanced towards his estate, however, and Narsi marched out to defend it. His flanks were commanded by the sons of Vistahm, Vinduyih and Tiruyih. Rostam Farrokhzad, another Persian noblemen, also sent the commander Jalinus to assist Narsi, but he did not arrive in time. In the ensuring battle, Narsi was soundly defeated, however he and his commanders managed to escape. Jalinus soon met the Muslim force as well, but he too was defeated.

References

Sources 
 

Kaskar
Kaskar
Kaskar
Kaskar